The 34th Primetime Emmy Awards were held on Sunday, September 19, 1982. The ceremony was broadcast on ABC. It was hosted by John Forsythe and Marlo Thomas.

In its eighth and final season, Barney Miller finally won the Emmy for Outstanding Comedy Series, it had been nominated and lost the previous six seasons. On the drama side, it was once again all about Hill Street Blues. It set multiple records on the night, including receiving 16 major nominations (winning four), breaking the long-held record (subsequently broken) of 14 for a comedy or drama set by Playhouse 90 in 1959. It also received nine acting nominations for regular cast members, this has since been tied by L.A. Law, The West Wing and Game of Thrones. Included in those acting nominations was another milestone, Hill Street Blues received every nomination for Outstanding Supporting Actor in a Drama Series, this achievement has not been duplicated by a comedy or drama in a major acting category since. Another milestone was set by Andrea Martin, who became the first actor from a variety series, in this case Second City Television, to be nominated in the comedy acting field since the categories merged in 1979.

Ingrid Bergman won her final award posthumously, for A Woman Called Golda. It was not only the fourth posthumous acting award in Emmy history, but also the second performance ever to have won from a non-Network Syndicated show.

Winners and nominees

Programs

Acting

Lead performances

Supporting performances

Directing

Writing

Most major nominations
By network 
 CBS – 43
 ABC / NBC – 34
 PBS – 13

 By program
 Hill Street Blues (NBC) – 16
 Fame (NBC) – 12
 M*A*S*H (CBS) – 10
 Brideshead Revisited (PBS) / Taxi (ABC) – 8
 Lou Grant (CBS) / Second City Television (NBC) – 6
 Barney Miller (ABC) – 5

Most major awards
By network 
 ABC – 8
 CBS / NBC – 7

 By program
 Hill Street Blues (NBC) / Fame (NBC)  – 4
 Taxi (ABC) – 3
 Bill (CBS) / M*A*S*H (CBS) / A Woman Called Golda (Syndicated) – 2

Notes

References

External links
 Emmys.com list of 1982 Nominees & Winners
 

034
Primetime Emmy Awards
Primetime Emmy
Primetime Emmy Awardss